Noble L. Mitchell (1854 – January 22, 1932) was an American politician and lawyer from Maryland. He served as a member of the Maryland House of Delegates, representing Harford County, from 1888 to 1890 and from 1900 to 1902.

Early life
Noble L. Mitchell was born in 1854 on Frederick Road near Gwynn's Falls, Baltimore, to Isaac Mitchell. He moved to Harford County with his father at the age of seven. He studied law with Edwin Hanson Webster and graduated from the University of Maryland School of Law in 1880.

Career
Mitchell started a law practice in Bel Air, Maryland. He was elected as secretary, treasurer and examiner of the Board of School Commissioners for Harford County and served until 1887.

Mitchell was a Democrat. He served as a member of the Maryland House of Delegates, representing Harford County, from 1888 to 1890. He withdrew from consideration for the Democratic nomination in the 1891 election. In 1897, Mitchell ran for the Democratic nomination for the Maryland Senate.

Mitchell served again in the Maryland House of Delegates from 1900 to 1902. He served as Speaker of the Maryland House of Delegates in 1902. In 1905, Mitchell ran for the Democratic nomination for the Maryland Senate, but lost to Thomas H. Robinson. He served in the Maryland House of Delegates in 1914 and 1918. He served as county auditor in Harford County.

Personal life
Mitchell married Elva M. Cannon in 1881. His wife died in 1908. They had three daughters, Edna, Anna and Winifred. They lived in Pleasantville, Harford County. Mitchell married Estelle "Stella" Archer, daughter of Stevenson Archer and cousin of Stevenson A. Williams, on December 26, 1917.

Mitchell died on January 22, 1932, at the Church Home and Infirmary in Baltimore.

References

External links

Date of birth unknown
1854 births
1932 deaths
Politicians from Baltimore
People from Harford County, Maryland
University of Maryland Francis King Carey School of Law alumni
Democratic Party members of the Maryland House of Delegates
Maryland lawyers